This is a list of seasons completed by the Texas Rangers, originally known as the Washington Senators, professional baseball franchise; they have played in the American League from their inception in 1961. The Rangers have played 61 seasons as a franchise (fifty in Arlington) and have made the postseason eight times.

Formed as the Washington Senators as the replacement team for Washington after the original Senators moved to Minnesota, the Senators played at Griffith Stadium and Robert F. Kennedy Memorial Stadium during their time in Washington, where they had just one winning season (1969) before moving to Arlington, Texas in 1972; the eight consecutive losing seasons from 1962 to 1969 is still the most in franchise history. The team continued to perform poorly, with only one season of over ninety wins and not a single postseason appearance until after the 1994 strike. After the George W. Bush/Edward W. Rose Partnership bought the team in 1989, the Rangers earned three postseason appearances in four years (1996 to 1999). The Rangers again declined to mediocrity under owner Tom Hicks after he bought the team in 1998. A series of questionable deals plagued the team until Hicks put the team into bankruptcy in 2010, at which time an ownership group led by Nolan Ryan and Chuck Greenberg bought the team and the Rangers began the best period of success in franchise history. Between 2010 and 2016, Texas reached the postseason five times, won four division titles along with two American League pennants to reach the World Series twice (in 2010 and 2011).

Season-by-season records

The Rangers finished tied with the Tampa Bay Rays for the second wild card spot. Tampa Bay defeated Texas 5–2, in a one-game playoff to clinch the wild card spot.

Record by decade 
The following table describes the Rangers' MLB win–loss record by decade.

Post-season record by year
The Rangers have made the postseason eight times in their history, with their first being in 1996 and the most recent being in 2016.

References
General
</ref>

Specific

External links 
 Rangers Year-By-Year Results at MLB.com
 Rangers Postseason Results at MLB.com
 Texas Rangers Statistics at Baseball-Reference.com
 Texas Rangers Stadiums and attendances at Baseball-Reference.com

 
Texas Rangers
Seasons